George Moffat or Moffatt may refer to:

George Moffatt (1787–1865), businessman and political figure in Lower Canada and Canada East
 George Moffatt (English politician) (1806–1878), British Member of Parliament for Dartmouth, Ashburton Honiton and Southampton
 George Moffat Sr. (1810–1878), New Brunswick businessman and Conservative politician
 George Moffat Jr. (1848–1918), son of the above, also a New Brunswick businessman and Conservative politician
 George B. Moffat Jr. (born 1927), American author and world champion sailplane pilot